Sometime may refer to:

Songs
 "Sometime" (Gene Thomas song), 1961
 "Sometime" (Glenn Miller song), 1939
 "Sometime", by DIIV from Oshin, 2012
 "Sometime", by Geri Halliwell from Schizophonic, 1999
 "Sometime", by James Brown from Hell, 1974
 "Sometime", by King's X from Ear Candy, 1996
 "Sometime", by Mavis Staples from We Get By, 2019
 "Sometime", written by Gus Kahn and Ted Fio Rito, 1925

Other uses
 Sometime (musical), a 1918 Broadway musical
 Sometime, a Thoroughbred racehorse, winner of the 1963 Caulfield Cup in Australia

See also
 Sometimes (disambiguation)